General elections were held in Trinidad and Tobago on 5 November 2007. Nomination day was 15 October. Five parties contested the elections; the ruling People's National Movement, the official opposition United National Congress–Alliance (a coalition of the UNC and six smaller parties), the Congress of the People, the Tobago United Front–Democratic Action Congress (a Tobago-based party) and the Democratic National Assembly (a new party based in Tobago). Five independent candidates also ran.

Opinion polls
A poll conducted by the Caribbean Development Research Services (CADRES) and published by the Trinidad and Tobago Newsday in October 2007 showed the Congress of the People ahead of the ruling People's National Movement by 7%.

Another poll from August indicated that the election would be a very close race.

Results
The PNM party under the leadership of Patrick Manning won 26 of the 41 seats in Parliament. The UNC-A, under the leadership of Basdeo Panday won the 15 remaining seats. The COP did not win any seats.

Winning candidate by constituency

Votes by constituency

The UNC-Alliance did not run for any seats in Tobago.

Candidates

UNCA
 Arima – Wayne Rodriguez
 Arouca/Maloney – Dianne Bishop-Bajnath
 Barataria / San Juan – Nazeemool Mohammed
 Caroni East – Tim Gopeesingh
 Chaguanas East – Kirk Meighoo
 Chaguanas West – Austin Jack Warner
 Couva North – Basdeo Panday
 Couva South – Kelvin Ramnath
 Cumuto / Manzanilla – Harry Partap
 Diego Martin West – Daphne Phillips
 Diego Martin Central – Steve Alvarez
 Diego Martin North / East – Andy Williams
 Fyzabad – Chandresh Sharma
 La Brea – Ravi Ratiram
 La Horquetta – Talparo – Jennifer Jones-Kernahan
 Laventille East – Morvant – Lennox Smith
 Laventille West – Juliet Davy
 Lopinot – Bon Air West – Prakash Williams
 Mayaro – Winston "Gypsy" Peters
 Naparima – Nizam Baksh
 Oropouche East – Roodal Moonilal
 Oropouche West – Mickela Panday
 Point Fortin – Fitzroy Beache
 Pointe-a-Pierre – Wade Mark
 Port of Spain South – Anthony Sammy
 Princes Town South – Tableland – Clifton De Coteau
 San Fernando East – Ramesh Karapan
 San Fernando West – Bishop Jankee Raghunanan
 Siparia – Kamla Persad-Bissessar
 St. Ann's East – Tricia Moraldo
 St. Augustine – Vasant Bharath
 St. Joseph – Carson Charles
 Tabaquite – Ramesh Lawrence Maharaj
 Toco – Sangre Grande – Keshore Satram
 Tunapuna – Christine Newallo

PNM
 Arima- Pennelope Beckles
 Arouca/Maloney – Alicia Hospedales
 Barataria/San Juan – Joseph Ross
 Caroni Central – Shivanand Narinesingh
 Caroni East – Harold Ramoutar
 Chaguanas East – Mustapha Abdul – Hamid
 Chaguanas West – Frankie Ranjitsingh
 Couva North – Nal Ramsingh
 Couva South – Naim Ali
 Cumuto/Manzanilla – Lennox Sirjusingh
 D'Abadie/O'Meara – Karen Nunez Tesheira
 Diego Martin Central – Amery Browne
 Diego Martin North/East – Colm Imbert
 Diego Martin West – Dr Keith Rowley
 Fyzabad – Andre Bernard
 La Brea – Fitzgerald Jeffrey
 La Horquetta/Talparo – Roger Joseph
 Laventille East/Morvant – Donna Cox
 Laventille West – Nyleung Hypolite
 Lopinot/Bon Air – Neil Parsanlal
 Mayaro – Michelle Mischier Boyd
 Naparima – Geeta Rampersad
 Oropouche East – Shafeeq Mohammed
 Oropouche West – Raghunath Mahabir
 Princes Town North – Marlon Mohammed
 Princes Town South/Tableland – Peter Taylor
 Point Fortin – Paula Gopee
 Point-a-Pierre – Christine Kangaloo
 Port of Spain North/St Ann's West- Gary Hunte
 Port of Spain South – Marlene McDonald
 San Fernando East – Patrick Manning
 San Fernando West – Junia Regrello
 Siparia – Lutchman Rampersad
 St Ann's East – Anthony Roberts
 St Augustine – Nadra Nathai-Gyan
 St Joseph – Kennedy Swaratsingh
 Tabaquite – Heeralal Rampertap
 Tobago East – Rennie Dumas
 Tobago West – Stanford Calender
 Toco/Sangre Grande – Indra Sinanan Ojah-Maharaj
 Tunapuna – Ester Le Gendre

COP
 TOBAGO EAST – Seeking Candidate name 234 votes
 TOBAGO WEST – Seeking Candidate name 471 votes 
 Rodger Dominic Samuel — Arima
 Rekha Ramjit — Naparima
 Nirad Tewarie — Chaguanas East
 Devant Maharaj — Couva South
 Lena Brereton Wolffe — Toco/Sangre Grande
 Ganga Singh — Caroni East
 Arthur Augustine — Laventille West
 La Toya Callender — Laventille East/Morvant
 Rabindra Moonan — Mayaro
 Rocky Garcia — Diego Martin West
 Sharon-Ann Gopaul-McNichol — Port-of-Spain South
 Mahendranath Dhaniram — Fyzabad
 Prakash Ramadhar — Caroni Central
 Navi MUradali — Princes Town North
 Carol Cuffy-Dowlat —Oropouche East
 Selby Wilson — Point Fortin
 Kevin Ratiram — Oropouche West
 Gilbert Agard — La Brea
 Carolyn Seepersad-Bachan — Pointe-à-Pierre
 Joe Pires — Diego Martin North East
 Kathy-Ann Jones — Arouca/Maloney
 Jamal Mohammed — San Juan/Barataria
 Manohar Ramsaran — Chaguanas West
 Nicole Dyer-Griffith — Diego Martin Central
 Desmond Lambert — Princes Town South/Tableland
 Wendy Lee Yuen — Cumuto/Manzanilla
 Daniel Solomon — Port-of-Spain North/St Ann's West
 Govindra Roopnarine — Siparia
 Clyde Weatherhead — Tunapuna
 Hulsie Bhaggan — Couva North
 Sherwin Alleyne — D’Abadie/O’Meara
 Jerome Chaitan — Lopinot/Bon Air West
 Gary Griffith — St Ann's East
 Delon Haynes — La Horquetta/Talparo
 Gillian Lucky — St Joseph
 Anand Ramlogan — Tabaquite
 Winston Dookeran — St Augustine
 Marlene Coudray – San Fernando West
 Mervyn Assam – San Fernando East

References

Elections in Trinidad and Tobago
Trinidad
General election
November 2007 events in North America